Alexander Roelof Smit (born 2 October 1985 in Geldrop) is a Dutch baseball player, who has played with the Netherlands national baseball team.

Smit signed originally with the Minnesota Twins as a non-drafted free agent on 14 July 2002, and was claimed off waivers by the Cincinnati Reds on 12 July 2007.

He's represented the Netherlands at the 2004 Summer Olympics in Athens, Greece, where he and his team finished in sixth place, at the 2008 Summer Olympics in Beijing, and at the 2006 and 2009 World Baseball Classic.

References

1985 births
2006 World Baseball Classic players
2009 World Baseball Classic players
Baseball players at the 2004 Summer Olympics
Baseball players at the 2008 Summer Olympics
Beloit Snappers players
Carolina Mudcats players
Dayton Dragons players
Dutch expatriate baseball players in the United States
Elizabethton Twins players
Fort Myers Miracle players
Gulf Coast Reds players
Gulf Coast Twins players
Living people
Olympic baseball players of the Netherlands
People from Geldrop
Sportspeople from North Brabant
Sarasota Reds players